Morning Ireland is the breakfast news programme broadcast by RTÉ Radio 1 in Ireland and is noted as that country's most listened to radio programme. It is broadcast each weekday morning between 07.00 and 09.00 and alternate items are normally presented by two presenters from the current rota, which included Audrey Carville, Rachael English, Gavin Jennings and Fran McNulty as of Cathal Mac Coille's retirement in 2017. Occasional weekend editions are also aired on the occasion of major breaking news stories such as general elections, referendums or important news events.

The programme has been broadcast since 1984 and since that time has been presented by numerous eminent broadcasters including Aine Lawlor, Cathal Mac Coille, David Hanly and Joe Little. On its 25th anniversary in 2009, the Irish Examiner called it "a phenomenal triumph".

The programme is thought to be important and influential to the field of politics in Ireland: Former President of Ireland Mary McAleese was a frequent contributor to the programme and, according to Noel Whelan of The Irish Times, "more often than not the first question asked of the Taoiseach raises something which was reported or said a few hours previously on Morning Ireland". Government ministers use the show to explain their views.

History

The programme was first broadcast on 4 November 1984. It replaced The Derek Davis Show. It had initially been postponed and endured a difficult time during its early years. The first major story to be covered by the programme was a few weeks after it began when an air crash in Eastbourne killed a number of journalists.

The first presenters of the programme were David Hanly and David Davin-Power. Davin-Power was also the first editor. Cathal Mac Coille succeeded David Hanly as the programme's signature voice, presenting it from 1986 to 1990 and again from 2001 to his retirement in 2017.  Joe Little and Shane Kenny are other former editors and presenters. John Murray presented for the first time in 1994, returning in 2004. Aine Lawlor began presenting alongside Hanly in 1995.

When Fianna Fáil's former government minister Desmond O'Malley left the party, Morning Ireland broadcast his renowned "I stand by the Republic" speech for an extended period, angering then Taoiseach Charles Haughey.

In 1994, Joe Little was due to co-present an edition of the programme from the RTÉ studio in Castlebar, County Mayo, during the European Parliament election of that year, when it was realised belatedly that it could not be heard in Dublin. Disaster was prevented by mere minutes. When the IRA announced its cease-fire that same year, Joe Little was in the Belfast studio beginning an interview with the former Secretary of State for Northern Ireland, Sir Patrick Mayhew, when the sound broke down live on air on a temporary basis. During one edition, the entire programme did malfunction, and, with interviews suspended and a commercial break impossible, Hanly intervened to prevent a complete disaster for several minutes by commenting to the show's previous guest: "There was one other question I wanted to ask you [...]". Joe Little interviewed Lady Valerie Goulding to commemorate the fiftieth anniversary of The Blitz of London by Germany.

In 1999, for Christmas Eve, the programme focused on those killed during The Troubles. Contributors to that programme included world leaders such as Bertie Ahern, Tony Blair, Bill Clinton and Mary McAleese. In 2005, a Mary McAleese interview for the programme caused controversy when she compared the children of Northern Ireland to Nazis. Ian Paisley, Jr. replied, "So much for bridge-building Mary", and described her remarks as "irrational and insulting". The Orange Institution cancelled a meeting it had ordered with McAleese as a result.

During the 2000s recession, an outside broadcast took place in the Waterford Crystal plant as employees barricaded themselves inside in a bid to save their careers. In another episode Minister for Finance, Brian Lenihan criticised John Murray for his "dangerous and irresponsible" line of questioning him about Irish banks.

Morning Ireland celebrated its 25th anniversary in November 2009. It was broadcast in front of a studio audience and featured guests including Mary McAleese, Brian Cowen, comedian Des Bishop and author Cathy Kelly. McAleese spoke of her intention to reduce her household budget during difficult recessionary times, including sending e-mails instead of posting cards for Christmas.

In 2010 the programme came to international attention after Taoiseach Brian Cowen gave a controversial nine-minute interview to Cathal Mac Coille from a Fianna Fáil think-in in Galway; the interview led to increased pressure for Cowen to resign in the days that followed due to allegations that he was drunk during the interview.

Garret FitzGerald made his final radio broadcast on the programme in 2011.

In 2010, two presenters, John Murray and Richard Downes, left the programme to expand to further areas of RTÉ, and were replaced by Aoife Kavanagh and Rachael English. The programme is also presented by Claire Byrne, Gavin Jennings and Fran McNulty.

Awards
Morning Ireland won 'News Programme of the Year' in the 2002, 2003 and 2008 PPI Radio Awards. Cian McCormack, a reporter for the programme, won News Reporter of the Year in 2009.

Hilary McGouran, Series Editor, and Shane McElhatton, Editor, were named by Village as amongst the 100 most influential people in Ireland in 2009. The studio and web producer of the programme, Lisa Pereira, a native of Trinidad and Tobago and educated in Ireland, France and the United States, was also on the list.

Format
The programme, which is co-presented by various presenters, consists of a mixture of live interviews and pre-recorded location reports. Extended news bulletins are broadcast at 07.00 and 08.00, followed by a weather forecast and "It Says In The Papers", a review of the Irish morning newspapers. There are news headlines followed by sports news at 07.30 and 08.30 and business news is broadcast at 07.45. AA Roadwatch provides traffic news throughout the programme.

A new website was launched in June 2009. It features additional material and a webcam that allows listeners to view the programme from the studio.  The live stream from the webcam is also broadcast on RTÉ's rolling news channel.

Ratings
Morning Ireland is the top rated radio programme in the Republic of Ireland, with a listenership estimated by the Joint National Listenership Survey to be 491,000. It is considered the most influential news programme on Irish radio. When ratings for the radio shows of prominent RTÉ broadcasters such as Joe Duffy, Pat Kenny and Gerry Ryan were declining in 2005, Morning Ireland remained Ireland's most popular radio programme. It was at one point rivalled by The Full Irish in second place  before that show ended.

References

External links

 
An article reporting on the first programme in 1984 in The Irish Times
Transcript of Mary McAleese on Morning Ireland, 27 January 2005 — includes her Nazi comments
Link to Mary Robinson interview concerning climate justice

1984 in Ireland
Irish breakfast radio shows
RTÉ News and Current Affairs
RTÉ Radio 1 programmes